Heussaff or Heusaff is a surname, and may refer to;

Heussaff is a toponymic surname that derives from an old spelling for the isle of Ushant (Eusa in modern Breton). Like for the surname Henaff or Gourcuff, the digraph -ff was introduced by Middle Ages' authors to indicate a nasalized vowel. In fact the modern orthography should be Heussañ.

Alan Heusaff, also Alan Heussaff - Breton nationalist, linguist and dictionary compiler
Solenn Heussaff - Filipino actress, model and singer

References

Breton-language surnames